Allen Isaacman is an American historian specializing in the social history of Southern Africa. He is a Regents Professor of History at the University of Minnesota. In 2015, he was inducted into the American Academy of Arts and Sciences.

Education and career 
Isaacman earned his B.A. at the City College of New York in 1964. He next studied African History at the University of Wisconsin under Jan Vansina and Philip D. Curtin, earning an M.A. in 1966 and a PhD in 1970. That same year, he joined the faculty in the Department of History at the University of Minnesota. In 2001, he became a Regents Professor of History at the University of Minnesota.

From 1978 to 1980, Isaacman was the Chaired Professor of Mozambican History at Eduardo Mondlane University, located in Maputo, Mozambique. From 1988 to 1998, he served as the Director of MacArthur Interdisciplinary Program on Global Change, Sustainability and Justice at the University of Minnesota and retained that role, from 1998 to 2011, as the program transitioned to become the Interdisciplinary Center for the Study of Global Change (ICGC).
Meanwhile, from 1997-1998, he was appointed Senior Research Fellow at the University of Zimbabwe, in Harare, Zimbabwe, and in 2009 was named an Extraordinary Professor at the University of Western Cape, located in Cape Town, South Africa.

Academic awards and honors 
Isaacman awards includes . His 1972 book, Mozambique: The Africanization of a European Institution, The Zambezi Prazos, 1750-1902, won the Melville J. Herskovits Award as the most distinguished publication on African Studies for the year 1972, while the 2013 book which he coauthored, Dams, Displacement and the Delusion of Development: Cahora Bassa and its Legacies in Mozambique, 1965-2007, won both the Herskovits Prize and the Martin Klein award from the American Historical Association (AHA). In 2013, Isaacman received the Distinguished Africanist Award from the African Studies Association.

Selected publications

Monographs 
 Mozambique: The Africanization of a European Institution, The Zambezi Prazos, 1750-1902 (University of Wisconsin Press, June 1972).
 The Tradition of Resistance in Mozambique: The Zambezi Valley, 1850-1921 (Heinemann and University of California Press, 1976) Translated into Portuguese in 1979.
 A Luta Continua: Creating a New Society in Mozambique (Fernand Braudel Center, SUNY, 1978).
 Co-authored with Barbara Isaacma, Mozambique: From Colonialism to Revolution: 1900-1982 (Westview Press, 1983).
 Co-authored with Fred Cooper, Florencia E. Mallon, Steve J. Stern, and William Roseberry, Confronting Historical Paradigms: Peasants, Labor, and the Capitalist World System in Africa and Latin America (University of Wisconsin Press, 1993).
 Cotton is the Mother of Poverty: Peasants, Work and Rural Struggle in Colonial Mozambique 1938-1961 (Heinemann, 1996).
 Slavery and Beyond: The Making of Men and Chikunda Ethnic Identity in the Unstable World of South Central Africa, 1750-1920 (Heinemann, 2005).
 Co-authored with Barbara Isaacman, Dams, Displacement, and the Delusion of Development: Cahora Bassa and Its Legacies in Mozambique, 1965-2007 (Ohio University Press, 2013)
 Co-authored with Barbara Isaacman, Samora Machel: A Life Cut Short (Ohio University,  Press 2020)

References 

Living people
University of Minnesota faculty
Fellows of the American Academy of Arts and Sciences
American historians
Historians of Africa
City College of New York alumni
University of Wisconsin alumni
Year of birth missing (living people)